Metarctia forsteri is a moth of the subfamily Arctiinae. It was described by Sergius G. Kiriakoff in 1955. It is found in Cameroon, the Democratic Republic of the Congo and Rwanda.

References

 

Metarctia
Moths described in 1955